Jeanine Ann Roose (October 24, 1937 – December 31, 2021) was an American child actress and psychologist.

Life and career 
Roose was born on October 24, 1937, to Ivan R. and Agatha Roose. Her first job was on The Jack Benny Program at the age of eight; the role, as that of "Baby" or "Little" Alice Harris, is one she would keep for most of her entertainment career. She was also featured as a character on The Fitch Bandwagon and The Phil Harris-Alice Faye Show from 1946 to 1954. The character shared a name with the real-life daughter of Phil Harris and Alice Faye; the couple's two daughters did not wish to appear on the program.

Other radio appearances included playing Chris in the Lux Radio Theatre production of I Remember Mama and an episode of Mr. President with Edward Arnold. Her sole film credit was as young Violet Bick in the 1946 film classic It's a Wonderful Life. She also starred in the unaired television pilot Arabella's Tall Tales.

Roose attended Audubon Junior High School. She later attended the University of California, Los Angeles, where she was a member of Alpha Delta Pi. She worked as a Jungian psychoanalyst in her later life. Roose married Eugene Richard Auger on September 4, 1964.

She died from an abdominal infection in Valley Village, California, on December 31, 2021, at the age of 84.

Works

References

External links 

Jeanine Roose on the RadioGOLDINdex
Jeanine A. Roose  profile at C.G. Jung Institute of Los Angeles

1937 births
2021 deaths
20th-century American actresses
Actresses from Los Angeles
American child actresses
American film actresses
American radio actresses
University of California, Los Angeles alumni
21st-century American psychologists